Frances Jones may refer to:

Frances Jones (colonist) (1710–1785), mother of the first First Lady of the United States, Martha Washington
Frances Follin Jones (1912–1999), American classicist and curator at the Art Museum, Princeton University
Frances Jones Mills (1920–1996), state official in Kentucky
Lady Frances Armstrong-Jones (born 1979), daughter of Antony Armstrong-Jones, 1st Earl of Snowdon
Frances Bannerman (née Jones, 1855–1940), Canadian poet
 Frances R. Jones (born 1911), American state legislator

See also
Francis Jones (disambiguation)